The Massachusetts congressional elections of 2006 were held on Tuesday, November 7, 2006.  The terms of all ten representatives to the United States House of Representatives were to expire on January 3, 2007, and therefore all were put up for contest. The winners of the elections served in the 110th United States Congress from January 3, 2007, to January 3, 2009.

Overview

District 1

In this solidly liberal district based in western Massachusetts, incumbent Democratic Congressman John Olver ran for a ninth term in Congress. Olver faced independent candidate William Szych in the general election, whom he handily defeated to return to Congress for another term.

District 2

Incumbent Democratic Congressman Richard Neal has represented this liberal, south-central Massachusetts-based district since his initial election in 1988. Seeking a tenth term, Congressman Neal faced no opposition other than write-in candidates and easily won re-election.

District 3

Congressman Jim McGovern, who built a reputation as an advocate for international human rights and as one of the most liberal members of Congress, has represented this solidly Democratic district since 1997. Facing no opposition in his bid for a sixth term, McGovern easily returned to Congress.

District 4

Long-serving incumbent Democratic Congressman Barney Frank, first elected in 1980, was one of the first openly gay prominent politicians in American history. Congressman Frank represents a solidly liberal district that extends from the southern suburbs of Boston to the South Coast.

District 5

Incumbent Democratic Congressman Marty Meehan has represented this district that includes the northeastern suburbs of Boston since 1993, and he faced no opposition in his bid for an eighth term. Though Meehan was overwhelmingly re-elected, he did not fully serve out his term and resigned in July 2007 to become the Chancellor of the University of Massachusetts Lowell.

District 6

Incumbent Democratic Congressman John Tierney, who was first elected in 1996 by defeating Republican Congressman Peter Torkildsen, sought a sixth term in Congress. Congressman Tierney faced Republican candidate Rick Barton in the general election, whom he was able to easily defeat.

District 7

This heavily liberal district, based in the northern and eastern suburbs of Boston, has been represented by incumbent Democratic Congressman Ed Markey since he was first elected in a 1976 special election. Congressman Markey sought a seventeenth term and faced no opponent in the general election, allowing him to return to Congress with ease.

District 8

This strongly liberal district based in the city of Boston and some of its suburbs, has been represented by Democratic Congressman Mike Capuano since he was first elected in 1998. Congressman Capuano faced no Republican opponent in his bid for a fifth term, but was easily re-elected over Socialist Workers Party candidate Laura Garza and garment worker.

District 9

Congressman Stephen Lynch has represented this staunchly liberal, south Boston district since a 2001 special election. Lynch has established a reputation as being a moderate-liberal in Congress, holding anti-abortion views that separate him from the mainstream of the Democratic Party. Congressman Lynch faced Republican candidate Jack Robinson in the general election and coasted towards  a fourth term in Congress.

District 10

This district, the most moderate in the commonwealth, but still decidedly liberal, consists of the South Shore, Cape Cod, and the Islands, along with some southern parts of Metropolitan Boston. This district has been represented by Democratic Congressman Bill Delahunt for the past ten years. Delahunt, seeking a sixth term in Congress, ran against Republican businessman Jeff Beatty and independent candidate Peter White, whom he was able to crush in the general election.

See also
United States House elections, 2006
United States House election, 2006 complete list

References

External links
2006 Primary Election Candidates on Secretary of the Commonwealth's site
2006 General Election Candidates on Secretary of the Commonwealth's site

United States House
Massachusetts
2006